Crooked River Township is an inactive township in Ray County, in the U.S. state of Missouri. It is part of the Kansas City metropolitan area.

History
Crooked River Township was founded in 1823. It was named from the river that runs through it.

References

Townships in Ray County, Missouri
Townships in Missouri